Chromik is a Polish surname. Notable people with the surname include:

 Jerzy Chromik (1931–1987), Polish long-distance runner
 Józefa Chromik (born 1946), Polish cross-country skier
  (born 1943), German writer and translator

Polish-language surnames